Level of detail may refer to:

 Level of detail (writing), the level of abstraction in written works
 Level of detail (computer graphics), the complexity of a 3D model representation